Jorge Oblitas Mendizábal (23 April 1831 – 24 December 1900) was a Bolivian politician who served as the seventh vice president of Bolivia from 1884 to 1888. He served as second vice president alongside first vice president Mariano Baptista during the administration of Gregorio Pacheco.

References 

1831 births
1900 deaths
Conservative Party (Bolivia) politicians
Vice presidents of Bolivia
Foreign ministers of Bolivia
Bolivian diplomats